Sir John Dudley Gibbs Medley was an Australian businessman and administrator. He held the position of Vice-Chancellor at the University of Melbourne from 1938 to 1951.

Early life 
Medley was born on 19 April 1891 in Oxford, England to Dudley Julius Medley and Isabel Alice Medley (née Gibbs). He was the eldest of seven children.

Military service 
Medley was commissioned in 1914 in the 6th (Glamorgan) Battalion, Welch Regiment. He later served as a railway transport officer in France and Belgium.

The University of Melbourne 
Medley was appointed Vice-Chancellor of the University of Melbourne on 1 July 1938, and oversaw the administration and leadership of the university through World War II.

Legacy 
In 1971, the John Medley Building at the University of Melbourne, Parkville Campus was named in Medley's honour.

References 

Vice-Chancellors of the University of Melbourne
1891 births
1962 deaths